Mark Edward Nolan (November 15, 1901 – August 19, 1967) was an American lawyer and politician.

Nolan lived in Gilbert, St. Louis County, Minnesota and graduated from Gilbert High School. He graduated from University of Notre Dame and taught at University of Notre Dame. Nolan practiced law in Gilbert, Minnesota. He served in the Minnesota House of Representatives in 1929 and 1930 and from 1933 to 1936. Nolan died in St. Louis County, Minnesota.

References

1901 births
1967 deaths
People from Gilbert, Minnesota
University of Notre Dame alumni
University of Notre Dame faculty
Minnesota lawyers
Members of the Minnesota House of Representatives